David Grant Walker FSA FRHS (1923 - 20 December 2017) was a British historian of the University of Swansea and the former chancellor of Brecon Cathedral. He was married to Margaret with whom he had children Catherine and Richard.

References 

1923 births
2017 deaths
Church in Wales
Alumni of the University of Bristol
Alumni of the University of Oxford
Academics of Swansea University
Fellows of the Royal Historical Society
Fellows of the Society of Antiquaries of London